Mahakali Highway (Nepali: महाकाली राजमार्ग) is a highway in western Nepal. It links Api Municipality in the Lesser Himalayas with the Western Terai region around Dhangadhi spanning around 325 km and links with State Highway 90 in India in the South. Mahakali Highway is proposed to be extended by 90 km to link Tinkar in Darchula District.

References

Highways in Nepal